The Law Union of Ontario, founded in 1974, is a coalition of over 200 progressive lawyers, law students and legal workers. The Law Union provides for an alternative bar in Ontario which seeks to counter the traditional protections afforded by the legal system to social, political and economic privilege. By demystifying legal procedures, attacking discriminatory and oppressive legislation, arguing progressive new applications of the law, and democratizing legal practice, the Law Union strives to develop collective approaches to bring about social justice.

External links
Law Union of Ontario
Jur-Ed Foundation

See also
Clayton Ruby
Paul Copeland
National Lawyers Guild

Legal organizations based in Ontario

Progressivism in Canada
Organizations based in Toronto
Human rights organizations based in Canada
Civil rights organizations in Canada
Legal advocacy organizations based in Canada